The following list contains songs produced, co-produced or remixed by hip-hop producer DJ Premier.

1989

Gang Starr - No More Mr. Nice Guy 
 01. "Premier & The Guru"3
 02. "Jazz Music"
 03. "Gotch U" 
 04. "Manifest" 
 06. "DJ Premier in Deep Concentration" 
 07. "Positivity (Remix)" 
 08. "Words I Manifest (Remix)"
 09. "Conscience Be Free" 
 10. "Cause and Effect"
 11. "2 Steps Ahead"
 12. "No More Mr. Nice Guy"
 14. "Positivity"

1990

Lord Finesse & DJ Mike Smooth - Funky Technician 

 01. "Lord Finesse's Theme Song Intro" (featuring Grandpa Finesse)
 02. "Baby, You Nasty (New Version)"
 06. "Slave to My Soundwave" (co-produced by DJ Mike Smooth)
 10. "A Lesson to Be Taught"
 12. "Strictly for the Ladies" (featuring Patricia (Chocolate))
 13. "Track the Movement"

Lord Finesse & DJ Mike Smooth - "Strictly for the Ladies / Back to Back Rhyming" 

 A1. "Strictly for the Ladies (Radio Remix)"
 B1. "Back to Back Rhyming (Vocal Remix)" (featuring A.G.)

Kool DJ Red Alert - (Part 3) Let's Make It Happen 

 08. "Red Alert Chant"

Branford Marsalis Quartet - Mo' Better Blues Soundtrack 

 08. "Jazz Thing" (featuring Gang Starr, co-produced by Branford Marsalis)

Gang Starr - Step in the Arena 
 01. "Name Tag (Premier & The Guru)"
 02. "Step in the Arena"
 03. "Form of Intellect"
 04. "Execution of a Chump (No More Mr. Nice Guy Pt. 2)"
 05. "Who's Gonna Take the Weight?"
 06. "Beyond Comprehension"
 07. "Check the Technique"
 08. "Lovesick"
 09. "Here Today, Gone Tomorrow"
 10. "Game Plan"
 11. "Take a Rest"
 12. "What You Want This Time?"
 13. "Street Ministry"
 14. "Just to Get a Rep" 
 15. "Say Your Prayers"
 16. "As I Read My S-A"
 17. "Precisely the Right Rhymes"
 18. "The Meaning of the Name"
 19. "Credit Is Due" [Japan-only bonus track]

1991

Cookie Crew - Fade to Black 

 09. "A Word from the Conscious" (co-produced by Guru)

Cookie Crew - "Secrets (Of Success)" 

 B3. "A Word to the Conscious" (co-produced by Guru)

Dream Warriors - "I Lost My Ignorance (And Don't Know Where to Find It)" 

 A1. "I Lost My Ignorance (And Don't Know Where to Find It) (Original Mix)" (featuring Gang Starr, co-produced by Guru and Dream Warriors)
 A2. "I Lost My Ignorance (And Don't Know Where to Find It) (Gang Starr Remix)" (featuring Gang Starr, co-produced by Guru)

Ice-T - "Lifestyles of the Rich and Infamous / The Tower" 

 A1. "Lifestyles of the Rich and Infamous (Remix)"

J Rock - Streetwize 

 04. "Brutality"
 05. "The Pimp"
 11. "Ghetto Law"
 14. "The Real One"
 20. "Neighborhood Drug Dealer (DJ Premier Remix)" [Bonus Track]

Subsonic 2 - Include Me Out 

 12. "Dedicated to the City" (featuring Keith E, co-produced by Guru and Subsonic 2)
 19. "Regardless" (co-produced by Guru, Subsonic 2 and MG Bad)

Subsonic 2 - "Unsung Heroes of Hip Hop" 

 B1. "Dedicated to the City (The Gang Starr Mix)" (co-produced by Guru)

Wendy & Lisa - Re-Mix-In-A-Carnation 

 05. "Satisfaction (Gangstarr Remix)" (featuring Guru)

1992

Gang Starr - Lovesick 12" 

 A1. "Lovesick (Extended Mix)"
 B2. "Credit Is Due"

Gang Starr - Daily Operation 
 01. "Daily Operation (Intro)"
 02. "The Place Where We Dwell"
 03. "Flip the Script"
 04. "Ex Girl to Next Girl"
 05. "Soliloquy of Chaos"
 06. "I'm the Man" (featuring Lil Dap & Jeru the Damaja)
 07. "’92 Interlude"
 08. "Take It Personal"
 09. "2 Deep"
 10. "24-7/365"
 11. "No Shame in My Game"
 12. "Conspiracy"
 13. "The Illest Brother"
 14. "Hardcore Composer"
 15. "B.Y.S."
 16. "Much Too Much (Mack a Mil)"
 17. "Take Two and Pass"
 18. "Stay Tuned"

Gang Starr - Take It Personal / DWYCK 12" 
 B1. "DWYCK" (featuring (Nice & Smooth)

Various Artists - Trespass Soundtrack 

 08. "Gotta Get Over (Taking Loot)" (by Gang Starr)

Gang Starr / Mobb Deep - Doe in Advance / Cop Hell 12" 
 A1. "Doe in Advance (Main Mix)"
 B1. "Cop Hell (Main Mix)"

Loose Ends - Tighten Up Vol. 1 

 05. "A Little Spice (Gang Starr Remix)" (co-produced by Guru)

Soul II Soul - Just Right 

 B2. "Intelligence (Jazzie II Guru Mix)" (co-produced by Guru)

Too Short - In the Trunk 

 B1. "In the Trunk (Glove Compartment Radio Mix)"

Compton's Most Wanted - Def Wish II 

 A1. "Def Wish II (East Coast Gang Starr Re-Mix)"

Neneh Cherry - Homebrew 

 01. "Sassy" (featuring Guru, co-produced by Guru)
 04. "I Ain't Gone Under Yet" (co-produced by Guru, Booga Bear, Johnny Dollar and Neneh Cherry)

Heavy D & the Boyz - Blue Funk 

 10. "Here Comes the Heavster"
 12. "Yes Y'all"

1993

Marxman - 33 Revolutions per Minute 

 09. "Drifting" (co-produced Guru)

Da Youngsta's - The Aftermath 

 13. "Wake Em Up"

Mobb Deep - Juvenile Hell 

 04. "Peer Pressure"

Boss - Deeper 

 B2. "Drive By (Rollin' Slow Remix)" (produced by Norris "Roblow" Jones Of Crimelab Music Group and Co-Produced by Erick Sermon)

Da King & I - Krak Da Weazel 

 B3. "Flip Da Scrip (Remix) (Main Pass)"

KRS-One - Return of the Boom Bap 

 01. "KRS-One Attacks"
 02. "Outta Here"
 04. "Mortal Thought"
 05. "I Can't Wake Up" (co-produced by KRS-One)
 12. ""P" Is Still Free"
 14. "Higher Level"

Red Fox - As a Matter of Fox 

 14. "Ya Can't Test Me Again"

Das EFX - Kaught in Da Ak 

 A1. "Kaught in Da Ak (Remix - Clean)"

Shyheim - On and On 

 A3. "On and On (Premier Remix)"

1994

Nas - Illmatic 

 02. "N.Y. State of Mind"
 06. "Memory Lane (Sittin' in da Park)"
 09. "Represent"

Gang Starr - Hard to Earn 
 01. "Intro (The First Step)"
 02. "ALONGWAYTOGO"
 03. "Code of the Streets"
 04. "Brainstorm"
 05. "Tonz 'O' Gunz"
 06. "The Planet"
 07. "Aiiight Chill..."
 08. "Speak Ya Clout"
 09. "DWYCK"
 10. "Words from the Nutcracker"
 11. "Mass Appeal"
 12. "Blowin' Up the Spot"
 13. "Suckas Need Bodyguards"
 14. "Now You're Mine"
 15. "Mostly tha Voice"
 16. "F.A.L.A."
 17. "Comin' for Datazz"

Gang Starr - Suckas Need Bodyguards 12" 

 B2. "The ? Remainz (Street Version)"

M.O.P. - "Rugged Neva Smoove" 

 B. "Rugged Neva Smoove (Premier Remix - Street)"
 D2. "Downtown Swinga (Radio)"

Jeru the Damaja - The Sun Rises in the East 
 01. "Intro (Life)"
 02. "D. Original"
 03. "Brooklyn Took It"
 04. "Perverted Monks in tha House (Skit)"
 05. "Mental Stamina" (featuring Afu-Ra)
 06. "Da Bichez"
 07. "You Can't Stop the Prophet"
 08. "Perverted Monks in tha House (Theme)"
 09. "Ain't the Devil Happy"
 10. "My Mind Spray"
 11. "Come Clean"
 12. "Jungle Music"
 13. "Statik"

Buckshot LeFonque - Buckshot LeFonque 

 01. "Ladies & Gentlemen, Presenting..." (co-produced by Branford Marsalis)
 05. "Wonders & Signs" (featuring Blackheart, co-produced by Branford Marsalis)
 08. "Some Shit @ 78 BPM (The Scratch Opera)"
 09. "Hotter Than Hot" (featuring Blackheart, co-produced by Blackheart)
 10. "The Blackwidow Blues" (featuring The Lady of Rage, co-produced by Branford Marsalis)
 11. "Breakfast @ Denny's" (co-produced by Branford Marsalis)
 13. "No Pain, No Gain" (co-produced by Branford Marsalis)
 15. "...And We Out" (co-produced by Branford Marsalis)
 16. "Breakfast @ Denny's (Uptown Version)" (featuring Uptown) [Bonus Track]

Big Daddy Kane - Daddy's Home 

 04. "Show & Prove" (featuring Big Scoop, J.Z., Ol' Dirty Bastard, Sauce and Shyheim)

The Notorious B.I.G. - Ready to Die 

 16. "Unbelievable"

Omar - "Keep Steppin'" 

 A3. "Keep Steppin' (D.J. Premier Mix)" (featuring Uptown)

Various Artists - Kickin Da Flava 

 03. "Ease My Mind (Premier's Radio)" (by Arrested Development)

Dream Warriors - Subliminal Simulation 

 05. "It's a Project Thing" (co-produced by Dream Warriors)
 07. "I've Lost My Ignorance" (featuring Guru, co-produced by Guru and Dream Warriors)

1995

Showbiz and A.G. - Goodfellas 

 05. "Next Level (Nyte Time Mix)"

Big Shug - "Treat U Better" 

 A1. "Treat U Better" (co-produced Guru)

Guru - Jazzmatazz, Vol. 2: The New Reality 

 05. "Skit A (Interview) / Watch What You Say" (featuring Chaka Khan and Branford Marsalis, co-produced by Guru)

Guru - "Lifesaver" 

 A2. "Lifesaver (DJ Premier Remix)"

Bone Thugs-n-Harmony - "1st of Tha Month" 

 A1. "1st of Tha Month (DJ Premier's Phat Bonus Remix)"

Various Artists - Clockers Soundtrack 

 05. "Return of the Crooklyn Dodgers" (by Crooklyn Dodgers '95 - Chubb Rock, O.C. and Jeru the Damaja)

Blahzay Blahzay - "Danger" 

 B1. "Danger (Remix) (Street Mix)"

Das EFX - Hold It Down 

 02. "No Diggedy"
 05. "Real Hip Hop (Original Version)"

KRS-One - KRS-One 

 01. "Rappaz R. N. Dainja"
 03. "MC's Act Like They Don't Know"
 08. "Wannabemceez" (featuring Mad Lion)

Fat Joe - Jealous One's Envy 

08. "The Shit Is Real (DJ Premier Remix)"
 13. "Success (DJ Premier Remix)"

Group Home - Livin' Proof 
 01. "Intro"
 02. "Inna Citi Life"
 03. "Livin' Proof"
 05. "Suspended in Time"
 06. "Sacrifice"
 07. "Up Against the Wall (Low Budget Mix)"
 09. "Baby Pa"
 10. "2 Thousand"
 11. "Supa Star"
 12. "Up Against the Wall (Getaway Car Mix)"
 13. "Tha Realness"

Scha Dara Parr - The Cycle Hits-Remix Best Collection 

 03. "Cracker MC's (DJ Premier Remix)"

Various Artists - The D&D Project 

 01. "1, 2 Pass It" (by D&D All-Stars (Doug E. Fresh, Fat Joe, Jeru the Damaja, KRS-One, Mad Lion and Smif-n-Wessun))

The D&D All-Stars - 1, 2 Pass It 12" 

 B1. "1, 2 Pass It Remix"

1996

Group Home - "Suspended in Time / Tha Realness" 

 A1. "Suspended in Time (Groovy Remix Street)" (featuring Groove Theory)

Bahamadia - Kollage 

 01. "Intro"
 04. "Rugged Ruff"
 05. "Interlude"
 13. "True Honey Buns (Dat Freak Shit)"
 14. "3 Tha Hard Way"

Big Shug - "Crush / Official" 

 A1. "Crush (Street)"

Jay-Z - Reasonable Doubt 

 06. "D'Evils"
 10. "Friend or Foe"
 13. "Bring It On" (featuring Big Jaz and Sauce Money)

Nas - It Was Written 

 04. "I Gave You Power"

D'Angelo - "Lady" 

 A1. "Lady (Clean Street Version)" (featuring AZ)

D'Angelo - "Me and Those Dreamin' Eyes of Mine" 

 B1. "Me and Those Dreamin' Eyes of Mine (Two Way Street Mix)"

Jeru the Damaja - Wrath of the Math 
 01. "Wrath of the Math"
 02. "Tha Frustrated Nigga"
 03. "Black Cowboys"
 04. "Tha Bullshit"
 05. "Whatever"
 06. "Physical Stamina"
 07. "One Day"
 08. "Revenge of the Prophet (Part 5)"
 09. "Scientifical Madness"
 10. "Not the Average"
 11. "Me or the Papes"
 12. "How I'm Livin'"
 13. "Too Perverted"
 14. "Ya Playin' Yaself"
 15. "Invasion"

M.O.P. - Firing Squad 
 01. "Intro"
 03. "Firing Squad" (featuring Teflon)
 04. "New Jack City" (featuring Teflon)
 05. "Stick to Ya Gunz" (featuring Kool G Rap)
 08. "Brownsville"
 09. "Salute"
 11. "Downtown Swinga ('96)"

Rawcotiks - "Hardcore Hip-Hop" 

 B1. "Hardcore Hip-Hop (Street Mix II)"

Special Ed - "Freaky Flow (DJ Premier Remixes)" 

 A2. "Freaky Flow (DJ Premier Remix) (Street Version)"

1997

Gang Starr - You Know My Steez 12" 

 B2. "So Wassup?! (Down & Dirty Version)"

Jeru the Damaja - "Me or the Papes" 

 B4. "Me, Not the Paper (Remix Dirty)"

The Notorious B.I.G. - Life After Death 

 1-04. "Kick in the Door" (featuring The Madd Rapper)
 2-05. "Ten Crack Commandments"

Buckshot LeFonque - "Music Evolution" 

 A1. "Music Evolution (DJ Premier Version)"

Howie B 

 "Take Your Partner by the Hand (DJ Premier Remix)"

The Lady of Rage - Necessary Roughness 

 11. "Some Shit"
 12. "Microphone Pon Cok" (featuring Madd 1)

Various Artists - Soul in the Hole Soundtrack 

 03. "Against the Grain" (by Sauce Money)

O.C. - Jewelz 

 02. "My World"
 03. "War Games" (featuring Organized Konfusion)
 07. "Win the G" (featuring Bumpy Knuckles)
 10. "M.U.G." (featuring Freddie Foxxx)

Zeebra - "マイクの刺客 / The Untouchable" 

 B1. "The Untouchable"

Jay-Z - In My Lifetime, Vol. 1 

 01. "Intro / A Million and One Questions / Rhyme No More"
 06. "Friend or Foe '98"

Rakim - The 18th Letter 

 04. "It's Been a Long Time"
 10. "New York (Ya Out There)"

Janet Jackson - "Together Again" 

 1. "Together Again" (DJ Premier 100 in a 50 Remix)
 2. "Together Again" (DJ Premier Just the Bass Vocal)

1998

Various Artists - Belly Soundtrack 

 02. "Devil's Pie" (by D'Angelo)
 13. "Militia Remix" (by Gang Starr)

Various Artists - Blade Soundtrack 

 02. "1/2 & 1/2" (by Gang Starr featuring M.O.P.)

Various Artists - Tommy Boy's Greatest Beats 1981 - 1996 

 5-02. "Wrath of My Madness (DJ Premier Remix)" (by Queen Latifah)

Gang Starr - Moment of Truth 
 01. "You Know My Steez"
 02. "Robbin Hood Theory"
 03. "Work"
 04. "Royalty" (featuring K-Ci & JoJo)
 05. "Above the Clouds" (featuring Inspectah Deck)
 06. "JFK 2 LAX"
 07. "Itz a Set Up" (featuring Hannibal Stax)
 08. "Moment of Truth"
 09. "B.I. vs Friendship" (featuring M.O.P.)
 10. "The Militia" (featuring Big Shug, Freddie Foxxx)
 11. "The Rep Grows Bigga"
 12. "What I'm Here 4"
 13. "She Knowz What She Wantz"
 14. "New York Strait Talk"
 15. "My Advice 2 You"
 16. "Make 'Em Pay" (featuring Krumbsnatcha)
 17. The Mall" (featuring G-Dep, Shiggy Sha)
 18. "Betrayal" (featuring Scarface)
 19. Next Time"
 20. "In Memory Of…"

Gang Starr - The Militia 12" 

 B1. "You Know My Steez (Three Men And A Lady Remix)" (featuring The Lady Of Rage, Kurupt)

Jay-Z - "A Million and One Questions" 

 B1. "A Million and One Questions (Premier Remix)"

M.O.P. - First Family 4 Life 

 02. "Breakin' the Rules"
 08. "I Luv" (featuring Freddie Foxxx)
 09. "Salute Part II" (featuring Gang Starr)
 11. "Handle Ur Bizness (DJ Premier Remix)"
 14. "Downtown Swinga '98"

Robbie Robertson - Contact from the Underworld of Redboy 

 11. "Take Your Partner by the Hand (Red Alert Mix)" (featuring Howie B)

Krumbsnatcha - Snatcha Season Pt. 1 

 07. "Closer to God"

Cheyenne - "Feel My Love" 

 B1. "Feel My Love (DJ Premier Remix)"

Jermaine Dupri - Life in 1472 

 12. "Protectors of 1472" (featuring Snoop Dogg, Warren G and R.O.C.)

Fat Joe - Don Cartagena 

 09. "Dat Gangsta Shit"

Funkmaster Flex - The Mix Tape Volume III 60 Minutes Of Funk (The Final Chapter) 

 20. "Freestyle" (by Gang Starr)

Jay-Z - Vol. 2... Hard Knock Life 

 01. "Intro - Hand It Down" (featuring Memphis Bleek)

Brand Nubian - Foundation 

 02. "The Return"

Paula Perry - "Extra, Extra!!" 

 A2. "Extra, Extra!! (LP Version)" (featuring Nikki D and Que 45)

All City - Metropolis Gold 

 07. "The Actual"

1999

Tef - Premier Presents...: F-U / Comin' At Cha 

 A. "F-U"
 B. "Comin' At Cha"

Gang Starr - Full Clip: A Decade of Gang Starr 

 1-01. "Intro"
 1-02. "Full Clip"
 1-03. "Discipline" (featuring Total)
 2-01. "All 4 Tha Ca$h"

Nas - I Am... 

 01. "Album Intro"
 02. "N.Y. State of Mind Pt. II"
 13. "Nas Is Like"

Group Home - A Tear for the Ghetto 

 06. "The Legacy" (featuring Guru)

Limp Bizkit - Significant Other 

 02. "N 2 Gether Now" (featuring Method Man, co-produced by Terry Date and Limp Bizkit)

Charli Baltimore - Cold as Ice 

 06. "Everybody Wanna Know"

Brandy - U Don't Know Me (Like U Used To) - The Remix EP 

 02. "Almost Doesn't Count" (DJ Premier Mix)"

Truck - Symphony 2000 / Who Am I 

 B2. "Who Am I (Album)"

Truck - Breaker One 12" 

 A2. "Breaker One (Dirty Version)"
 B2. "Bring It To The Cypher (Dirty Version)" (featuring KRS-One)

A.G. - The Dirty Version 

 09. "Weed Scented" (featuring O.C., Mr. Mudd and Guru)

Mos Def - Black on Both Sides 

 16. "Mathematics"

Nas - Nastradamus 

 06. "Come Get Me"

Rakim - The Master 

 03. "When I B on the Mic"
 16. "Waiting for the World to End"

The Notorious B.I.G. - Born Again 

 11. "Rap Phenomenon" (featuring Method Man & Redman)

Jay-Z - Vol. 3... Life and Times of S. Carter 

 02. "So Ghetto"

2000

Afu-Ra - Body of the Life Force 

 03. "Defeat"
 07. "Mic Stance"
 12. "Visions"
 15. "Equality" (featuring Ky-Mani)
 16. "Monotony"

Big L - The Big Picture 

 01. "The Big Picture (Intro)"
 08. "The Enemy" (featuring Fat Joe) Originally released in 1997
 12. "Platinum Plus" (featuring Big Daddy Kane)

Chauncey Black - Shame On You 

 "Shame On You" (co prod. by Chauncey Black)

Black Eyed Peas - Bridging the Gap 

 01. "BEP Empire"

Sonja Blade - "Look 4 Tha Name" 

 A1. "Look 4 Tha Name (Street Version)/ Body Bag Sh*t"

Bumpy Knuckles - Industry Shakedown 

 14. "R.N.S."
 19. "Part of My Life"

Capone-n-Noreaga - The Reunion 

 05. "Invincible"

Common - Like Water for Chocolate 

 09. "The 6th Sense" (featuring Bilal)

D'Angelo - Voodoo 

 02. "Devil's Pie"

D.I.T.C. - D.I.T.C. 

 01. "Thick"
 09. "Ebonics (Premo Mix)"
 11. "Da Enemy"

D.I.T.C. - The Official Version 

 B1. "Where Ya At (Remix)"

Edo. G - The Truth Hurts 

 01. "Sayin' Somethin'"

Guru  - Jazzmatazz, Vol. 3: Streetsoul 

 03. "Hustlin' Daze" (featuring Donell Jones)
 12. "Where's My Ladies" (feat. Big Shug) [co-produced with Guru]

Heather B - "Guilty" 

 A1. "Guilty (Street)"

M.O.P. - Warriorz 

 01. "Premier Intro"
 03. "Everyday" (featuring Product G&B)
 05. "Face Off 2K1"
 09. "On the Front Line"
 11. "Follow Instructions"
 18. "Roll Call"

PUSHIM - "Set Me Free" 

 A1. "Set Me Free (Main Mix)"

Rah Digga - Dirty Harriet 

 16. "Lessons of Today"

The Lox - We Are the Streets 

 09. "Recognize"

Sauce Money - Middle Finger U 

 11. "Intruder Alert"

Screwball - Y2K The Album 

 03. "F.A.Y.B.A.N."
 06. "Seen It All"

Tony Touch - The Piece Maker 

 02. "The Piece Maker" (featuring Gang Starr)

Various Artists - Lyricist Lounge 2 

 17. "I've Committed Murder" (by Macy Gray, featuring Mos Def, co-produced by Guru)

2001

Biz Markie - "...And I Rock / Interview" 

 A1. "...And I Rock" (featuring Black Indian)

DJ Cam - Soulshine 

 14. "Voodoo Child (DJ Premier Remix)" (featuring Afu-Ra)

Craig David - "7 Days (DJ Premier Remix)" 

 "7 Days" (Remix) w/o Mos Def and Nate Dogg
 "7 Days" (Remix) w/o Nate Dogg
 A1. "7 Days (DJ Premier Remix) (Vocal)" (featuring Mos Def and Nate Dogg)

Dilated Peoples - Expansion Team 

 03. "Clockwork"

Guru - Baldhead Slick & Da Click 

 02. "Back 2 Back" (featuring Mendoughza)

J-Live - The Best Part 

 16. "The Best Part"

Jadakiss - Kiss tha Game Goodbye 

 06. "None of Y'all Betta" (featuring Styles P and Sheek)

Janet Jackson - "All for You" 

 1. "All for You" (Top Heavy Remix)
 2. "All for You" (Top Heavy TV Mix)
 3. "All for You" (Top Heavy Remix Instrumental)

Limp Bizkit - New Old Songs 

 08. "Getcha Groove On (Dirt Road Mix)" (featuring Xzibit)
 14. "My Way (DJ Premier Way Remix)"

Lina - "It's Alright (Gang Starr Remix)" 

 A1. "It's Alright (Gang Starr Remix)" (featuring Gang Starr, co-produced by Guru)

Nas - Stillmatic 

 08. "2nd Childhood"

Various Artists - Fat Beats Compilation, Volume One 

 02. "The Lah" (by Bumpy Knuckles)
 05. "Bigacts Littleacts (Remix)" (by Afu-Ra, featuring GZA)

Various Artists - Rawkus Exclusive 

 01. "First Nigga (DJ Premier Remix)" (by Kool G Rap)

Various Artists - Training Day soundtrack 

 13. "Tha Squeeze" (by Gang Starr)

2002

Afu-Ra - Life Force Radio 

 07. "Lyrical Monster"
 17. "Blvd." (featuring Guru)

Various Artists - Music from and Inspired by the Motion Picture 8 Mile 

 1-15. "Battle" (by Gang Starr)

Devin the Dude - Just Tryin' Ta Live 

 11. "Doobie Ashtray"

Gang Starr - Skills / Natural 12" 

 A2. "Skills (Main Version)"
 B2. "Natural (Main Version)"

Heather B - Eternal Affairs 

 02. "Steady Rockin'" (featuring Twyla)

Jaz-O & The Immobilarie - Kingz Kounty 

 01. "718"
 13. "Love Is Gone"

Just-Ice - "Gangsta's Don't Cry / Just Rhymin' with Kane" 

 A1. "Gangsta's Don't Cry (Street)"

Krumbsnatcha - Respect All Fear None 

 04. "Incredible" (featuring Guru)

Non Phixion - The Future Is Now 

 07. "Rock Stars"

Ras Kass - "Goldyn Chyld" 

 A2. "Goldyn Chyld (Street Version)"

Royce da 5'9" - Rock City (Version 2.0) 

 04. "My Friend"
 11. "Boom"

Snoop Dogg - Paid the Cost to Be the Bo$$ 

 13. "The One and Only"
 18. "Batman & Robin" (featuring The Lady of Rage & RBX)

Snoop Dogg Presents…Doggy Style Allstars - Welcome to Tha House, Vol. 1 

 14. "Unfucwitable" (featuring The Lady of Rage)

The X-Ecutioners - Built from Scratch 

 12. "Premier's X-Ecution"

Tony Touch - The Last of the Pro Ricans 

 07. "Gotcha Back" (featuring Rise & Shine)

Various Artists - Fat Beats Compilation, Volume Two 

 12. "Just Rhymin with Kane" (by Just-Ice, featuring Big Daddy Kane)

Xzibit - Man vs. Machine 

 2-02. "What a Mess"

2003

Bumpy Knuckles - Konexion 

 03. "Paine (Pressure At INdustry Expense)"
 13. "Lazy Days"

Craig G - This Is Now!!! 

 03. "Ready Set Begin"

The Ranjahz - Who Feels It Knows 

 03. "Inspiration" (featuring Cee-Lo)

Just-Ice - History / Love Rap 

 A1. "History"
 B1. "Love Rap (Street)"

Various Artists - Fat Beats Compilation, Volume Three 

 02. "Any Type of Way" (by Big Daddy Kane)
 11. "History" (by Just-Ice)

KRS-One - D.I.G.I.T.A.L. 

 06. "Bring It to the Cypher"

Gang Starr - The Ownerz 
 01. "Intro (HQ, Goo, Panch)"
 02. "Put Up or Shut Up" (featuring Krumbsnatcha)  
 03. "Werdz from the Ghetto Child" (featuring Smiley The Ghetto Child)  
 04. "Sabotage"  
 05. "Rite Where U Stand" (featuring Jadakiss) 
 06. "Skills"  
 07. "Deadly Habitz"  
 08. "Nice Girl, Wrong Place" (featuring Boy Big)  
 09. "Peace of Mine" 
 10. "Who Got Gunz" (featuring Fat Joe & M.O.P.) 
 11. "Capture (Militia Pt. 3)" (featuring Big Shug & Freddie Foxxx) 
 12. "PLAYTAWIN"  
 13. "Riot Akt"  
 14. "(Hiney)"  
 15. "Same Team, No Games" (featuring NYG'z & H. Stax) 
 16. "In This Life..." (featuring Snoop Dogg & Uncle Reo)  
 17. "The Ownerz"  
 18. "Zonin'"  
 19. "Eulogy"  
 20. "Natural" [Japan Bonus Track] 
 21. "Tha Squeeze" [Japan Bonus Track]

2004

CeeLo Green - Cee-Lo Green... Is the Soul Machine 

 11. "Evening News" (featuring Chazzie & Sir Cognac the Conversation)

Freddie Foxxx - "Turn Up the Mics / Teach the Children" 

 B1. "Teach the Children (Main Mix)"

Hasstyle - "BX-TRA" 

 02. "Projects" (featuring Shinobi #7)

Masta Ace Incorporated - "Born to Roll / Saturday Night Live (DJ Premier Remix)" 

 B1. "Saturday Night Live (DJ Premier Remix) (Main)"

Nas - It Was... Remixed (Rare Unreleased & Remixed) 

 B2. "Nas Is Like (DJ Premier Remix)"

Pitch Black - Pitch Black Law 

 03. "It's All Real"
 10. "Got It Locked" (featuring Foxy Brown)

Proof - I Miss the Hip Hop Shop 

 12. "Play with Myself" (Freestyle)

Royce Da 5'9" - Death Is Certain 

 07. "Hip Hop"

The Marxmen - Marxmen Cinema 

 1-04. "Bloody Murdah"

Various Artists - Fastlife Music Presents: Code of the Streets 

 16. "2 to the Stomach" (by Blaq Poet)

2005

Afu-Ra - State of the Arts 

 13. "Sucka Free"

AZ - A.W.O.L. 

 10. "The Come Up"

Big Shug - Who's Hard? 

 02. "The Way It Iz"
 03. "Counter Punch" (featuring Guru)
 04. "On the Record"
 05. "Bang 'Em Down"
 06. "Do Ya"
 07. "Tha 3 Shugs"
 08. "Sic a Niguz" (featuring Bumpy Knuckles)
 19. "Dirt" (featuring H Stax & Smiley the Ghetto Child)
 20. "What's Really Real?"

Blaq Poet - "We Gonna Ill / Poet's Comin'" 

 A1. "We Gonna Ill (Street)"
 B1. "Poet's Comin' (Street)"

Gang Starr Foundation - Ahead of the Game 

 01. "Intro" (co-produced by DJ Jones)

Heather Hunter - H Double: The Unexpected 

 09. "Freak Like Me"

Lord Finesse - Rare Selections EP Vol. 3 

 A1. "Keep the Crowd Listening (DJ Premier Remix)"

M.O.P. - St. Marxmen 

 07. "Pop Shots (featuring O.D.B.)"

Smooth B - "Game Over / Rude Awakening" 

 A1. "Game Over (Street)"

Ol' Dirty Bastard - Osirus 

 01. "Pop Shots (Wu-Tang)"

Sway & King Tech - Back 2 Basics 

 08. "Enough Beef" (featuring Royce da 5'9", Common & Chino XL)

Teriyaki Boyz - Beef or Chicken? 

 11. "You Know What Time Is It!?"

Tony Touch - "Play that Song" 

 B2. "Gangsta Gangsta (Dirty Version)" (featuring Tego Calderón)

2006

AZ - The Format 

 10. "The Format"

Agallah - You Already Know 

 06. "New York Ryder Music"

Black Eyed Peas - Renegotiations: The Remixes 

 03. "My Style (DJ Premier Remix)" (featuring Justin Timberlake)

Blaq Poet - Rewind: Deja Screw 

 01. "Bang This"
 03. "Message from Poet"
 06. "Watch Your Back"
 10. "Poet Has Come"

Christina Aguilera - Back to Basics 

 1-01. "Intro (Back to Basics)" (featuring Linda Perry)
 1-03. "Back in the Day"
 1-04. "Ain't No Other Man"
 1-11. "Still Dirrty"
 1-13. "Thank You (Dedication to the Fans)"

F.A.B.I.D. - "Proper Dosage / It Iz What It Iaz" 

 A2. "Proper Dosage (Dirty)" (featuring Boy Big)

Lake Featuring Cormega - My Brother's Keeper 

 18. "Dirty Game"

MC Lyte - Back To Lyte 

 "Wonder Years"

Panjabi MC - Inside Man (Soundtrack) 

 "Chaiyya Chaiyya Bollywood Joint"

Pitch Black - Revenge 

 01. "Nice" (featuring Styles P)
 02. "Revenge"
 03. "Rep Da Hardest"

Ras Kass - Eat or Die 

 11. "Realness Freestyle"

Smiley the Ghetto Child - The Antidote 

 14. "The Wake Up Call"

Tef - "Showtime / Just Rhymin' with Krumb" 

 A1. "Showtime (Dirty)"

Termanology - "Watch How It Go Down (Remix) / Far Away" 

 A2. "Watch How It Go Down (Remix) (Dirty)" (featuring Papoose & Lil' Fame)

Various Artists - The Source Presents Fat Tape 

 17. "Never Be" (by J-Hood)

Verbal Threat - "Reality Check / Reckless Eye-Ballin'" 

 A1. "Reality Check (Main)"

Gang Starr - Mass Appeal: Best of Gang Starr 

 19. "The Natural"

2007

Big Shug - Streetchamp 

 04. "Play It"
 08. "Streets Move" (featuring Singapore Kane)
 10. "It Just Don't Stop"

Kanye West - Graduation 

 10. "Everything I Am"

Kanye West, Nas, KRS-One & Rakim - "Better Than I've Ever Been / Classic (Remix)" 

 B1. "Classic (Better Than I've Ever Been) (DJ Premier Remix)"

Mark Ronson - "Just" 

 A2. "Just (DJ Premier's Justremixitmix) (Clean)" (featuring Blaq Poet and Phantom Planet)

NYGz - Welcome 2 G-Dom 

 01. "Itz On" (featuring Rave)
 02. "Ya Dayz R #'d"
 06. "Get 2 Tha Point"
 07. "G'z & Hustlaz" (featuring Rave)
 08. "Welcome 2 G-Dom"
 10. "Giantz Ta Thiz"
 16. "Strength"

NYG'z - "Ya Dayz R #'d / N.H.B. / What Kinda Life" 

 B1. "N.H.B. (Street)" (featuring Blaq Poet)

Royce da 5'9" - "The Bar Exam" 

 A1. "Hit'Em (Street)"
 B1. "Ding! (Street)"

Special Teamz - Stereotypez 

 06. "Main Event"

2008

Big Shug - Other Side of the Game 

 02. "Soundcheck"
 03. "When I Strike"
 05. "Like a Muhfucka"
 09. "My Boston" (featuring Termanology & Singapore Kane)

Byata - Undefined 

 14. "Byata Is the Illest"

Fat Joe - The Elephant in the Room 

 12. "That White"

House of Repz - "U Gotta Love Us" 

 01. "U Gotta Love Us"

Ill Bill - The Hour of Reprisal 

 09. "Society Is Brainwashed"

Smirnoff Signature Mix Series - "Criminal Minded '08 / The Light '08 / Midnight '08" 

 A1. "Criminal Minded '08" (by KRS-One)

Kool G Rap - Half a Klip 

 09. "On the Rise Again" (feat. Haylie Duff)

Laura Izibor - Shine 

 02. "From My Heart to Yours (DJ Premier Version)"

Little Vic - Each Dawn I Die 

 07. "The Exorcist"

Ludacris - Theater of the Mind 

 12. "MVP"

Maroon 5 - Call and Response: The Remix Album 

 15. "Secret (Premier 5 Remix)"

NYGz - "Welcome 2 G-Dom / Ya Dayz R #'d (NYGemix)" 

 B1. "Ya Dayz R #'d (NYGemix) (Street)" (featuring Bumpy Knuckles, Lady of Rage and Royce da 5'9")

Reks - Grey Hairs 

 03. "Say Goodnight"

DJ Premier - Beats That Collected Dust Vol. 1 

 01. "Spin Live"
 02. "Sing Like Bilal"
 03. "Blow Horn Joint"
 04. "Pee-An-Oh"
 05. "Mysterious"
 06. "Dadaa"
 07. "Dink"
 08. "B-Line"
 09. "Trackhorn"
 10. "Waaaaaa"
 11. "Droop"
 12. "Original Represent"

Termanology - Politics as Usual 

 02. "Watch How It Go Down"
 07. "How We Rock" (featuring Bun B)
 10. "So Amazing"

Torae - Daily Conversation 

 05. "Click" (featuring Skyzoo)
 13. "Get It Done" (featuring Skyzoo)

2009

Blaq Poet - Tha Blaqprint 
 01. "I-Gititin" 
 03. "Ain't Nuttin' Changed"
 04. "What’s the Deal?"
 05. "Legendary Pt. 1" (featuring Nick Javas 7 NYGz)
 06. "Hood Crazy"
 07. "Voices"
 08. "Hate" (featuring N.O.R.E.)
 10. "Stretch Marks & Cigarette Burns" (featuring Panchi & Imani Montana)
 11. "S.O.S."
 12. "Let the Guns Blow"
 13. "Don't Give a Fucc"
 14. "Rap Addiction" (featuring Lil' Fame & Shabeeno)
 15. "Never Goodbye"

Capone-N-Noreaga - Channel 10 

 06. "Grand Royal"

Cormega - Born And Raised 

 07. "Make It Clear"
 11. "Dirty Game"

M.O.P. - Foundation 

 05. "What I Wanna B" (feat. Rell)

Reks - More Grey Hairs 

 03. "Cloud 9"

Royce da 5'9" - Street Hop 

 04. "Something 2 Ride 2" (featuring Phonte)
 10. "Shake This"
 19. "Hood Love" (featuring Bun B & Joell Ortiz)

Seven - "Go Slow" 

 B1. "Go Slow" (featuring Talib Kweli) (DJ Premier Remix)

Rytmus - Král 

 15. "Jediný" (feat. DJ Premier)

Deams - The Legacy EP 

 01. "DJ Premier Legacy Intro" (feat. DJ Premier)

2010

Bun B - Trill O.G. 

 13. "Let 'Em Know"

Canibus - C of Tranquility 

 06. "Golden Terra Of Rap"
 15. "Golden Terra Of Rap" (iM Remix) (featuring Donwill & Von Pea, Moe Green & Truthlive)

Fat Joe - The Darkside 

 11. "I'm Gone"

Joell Ortiz 

 "Project Boy"

Smiley the Ghetto Child - I'm Legend 

 A1. "I'm Legend"

DJ Premier Presents Get Used To Us 

 01. "Bang Dis!" (featuring Blaq Poet)
 02. "Policy" (featuring NYGz)
 03. "Opportunity Knoccs" (featuring Nick Javas)
 04. "Hot Flames" (featuring Khaleel)
 05. "Epic Dynasty" (featuring Dynasty)
 07. "Temptation" (featuring Young Maylay)
 08. "5%" (featuring KRS-One & Grand Puba)
 09. "Ya Dayz R #'d (NYGemix)" (featuring NYGz, The Lady of Rage, Bumpy Knuckles & Royce da 5'9")
 10. "Sing Like Bilal" (featuring Joell Ortiz)
 11. "Married 2 Tha Game" (featuring Teflon & Styles P)
 12. "Not A Game" (featuring Nick Javas)
 13. "Ain't Nuttin' Changed (Remix)" (featuring Blaq Poet, MC Eiht & Young Maylay)
 14. "Lifetime Membership" (featuring Teflon, Saigon & Papoose)
 16. "The Gang Starr Bus" (featuring Bumpy Knuckles)

2011

Apathy -  Honkey Kong

 05. "Stop What Ya Doin'" (featuring Celph Titled)

Bushido - Jenseits von Gut und Böse 

 10. "Gangster"

DJ Premier - Beats That Collected Dust Vol. 2

 01. "John T."
 02. "Ch-Ching"
 03. "Dots"
 04. "Doomp Doomp Doomp"
 05. "Stylesss"
 06. "Epic-ishh"
 07. "Beautiful"
 08. "Change"
 09. "Live Pro"
 10. "I Don't Know"
 11. "Late Night"
 12. "N.Y.S.O.M. #20"

DJ Premier & The Berklee Symphony - Regeneration CDQ

 "Regeneration" (featuring Nas)

DJ Premier 

 "Yo MTV Raps Theme Remix"

Edo G - A Face In The Crowd

 01. "Fastlane"

Evidence -  Cats & Dogs

 06. "You"
 17. "The Epilogue"

Mac Miller 

 "Face the Facts"

Game - The R.E.D. Album

 18. "Born In the Trap"

Joell Ortiz - Free Agent

 05. "Sing Like Bilal"

Kendra Morris - Concrete Waves 

 "Concrete Waves" (DJ Premier 320 Remix)

Nick Javas - Destination Unknown 

 "Anonymous" (featuring Khaleel)
 "One of Them Days"

Prop Dylan - The Cardinal Sin

 "Shock & Amaze"

Reks - Rhythmatic Eternal King Supreme

 01. "25th Hour"

Roscoe P. Coldchain 

 "Imma Kill This Nigga" (featuring Ab-Liva)

Royce da 5'9" -  Success Is Certain

 01. "Second Place"
 13. "Writer's Block" (DJ Premier Remix) (featuring Eminem) [iTunes Bonus Track]

SebastiAn - Embody 

 B. "Embody (DJ Premier 95 Break Remix)"

Slick Rick - The Sitter O.S.T. 

 "Need Some Bad"

Soulkast - Honoris Causa 

 01. "Première Salve"

Teflon 

 "4 Tha Love"
 Sample Credit: Isaac Hayes - "The Feeling Keeps On Coming"

Torae - For the Record 

 12. "For the Record"

Venom - Vigilantes 

 A2. "Vigilantes" (DJ Premier VHS Remix) (featuring Blaq Poet)

Verve Records and Rockstar Games Present LA Noire Remixed 

 04. "Ain't Nobody Here But Us Chickens" (DJ Premier Remix)

Wais P - Premo Pimpin' EP 

 01. "Competition (Skit)"
 02. "Multiple Sclerosis"
 03. "Premo Fresh (Skit)"
 04. "Money In The Yard"
 05. "Some of The Best (Skit)"
 06. "Lessons"
 07. "Premo Still Prevail"
 08. "Come Back To Collect"
 09. "When The Cops Come (Snitch Bitch)"
 10. "Trill OG Bun B (Skit)"
 11. "Ampitheatre"

2012

DJ Premier & Bumpy Knuckles - StOoDiOtYmE EP 

 01. "StOoDiOtYmE"
 02. "Fake"
 03. "That Preemo Shit"
 04. "tAkEiT2tHeToP"
 05. "Inspired By Fire"

DJ Premier & Bumpy Knuckles - KoleXXXion 
 01. "My Thoughts"
 02. "Shake the Room" (featuring Flavor Flav)
 03. "B.A.P. (Bumpy And Premier)"
 04. "eVrEEbOdEE"
 05. "wEaRe aT WaR"
 06. "P.A.I.N.E. (Pressure At Industry Expense)"
 07. "The Life"
 08. "F.Y.P.A.U. (Fuck Your Punk Ass Up)"
 09. "D'Lah"
 10. "More Levels"
 11. "GrEaTnEsS"
 12. "EyEnEvErPuTmY4cUsAwAy"
 13. "Turn Up the Mic (DJ Premier Remix)" (featuring Nas)
 14. "The Key"
 15. "OwNiT"
 16. "The Gang Starr Bus"

N.O.R.E. - Crack On Steroids mixtape 

 11. "Thiz Iz Hip Hop" (featuring Bumpy Knuckles)

La Coka Nostra - Masters of the Dark Arts 

 04. "Mind Your Business"

38 Spesh - Time Served mixtape 

 20. "No More"

Big Shug - I.M. 4-Eva 

 02. "Hardbody" (featuring Fat Joe & M.O.P)
 03. "Spit Six"
 05. "Blue Collar"
 11. "We Miss You"

Scott Knoxx - Take Off 

 04. "Make the Sound" (featuring Rhymefest & Money-B)

ChrisCo - MI State of Mind 

 02. "Straight Up" (featuring Jon Connor & Elzhi)

Lil' Fame & Termanology - Fizzyology 

 06. "Play Dirty" (featuring Busta Rhymes & Styles P)

Vinnie Paz - God of the Serengeti 

 03. "The Oracle"

Game 

 "HVN4AGNGSTA" (featuring Master P)

2013

Joey Bada$$ - Summer Knights 
 17. "Unorthodox"

Big Daddy Kane 
 "28 Bars of Kane"

Khaleel 
 "Nobody Tryna Hear Ya"

Czarface - Czarface 
 09. "Let It Off"

Ill Bill - The Grimy Awards 

 17. "World Premier"

Demigodz - Killmatic 

 06. "Worst Nightmare"

Papoose - The Nacirema Dream 

 15. "Turn It Up"

Tony Touch - The Piece Maker 3: Return of the 50 MC's 

 01. "Touch and D-Stroy" (featuring D-Stroy)

Rapsody - She Got Game 

 14. "Kingship"

Fat Joe - The Darkside Vol. 3 

 05. "Your Honor" (featuring Action Bronson)

Mack Wilds - New York: A Love Story 

 06. "Keepin It Real" (co-produced by Salaam Remi)

Dynasty - A Star In Life's Clothing 

 05. "Street Music"

Sokół & Marysia Starosta - Czarna Biała Magia 

 13. "Zepsute Miasto"

Kontrafakt - Navždy 

 01. "O5 S5"

Disclosure - Settle (Special Edition) 

 03. "Latch" (DJ Premier Remix)

2014

DJ Premier 
 "Guitar Stomp" (Instrumental)
 "Love At The Store" (Instrumental)
 "Zoo York Welcomes Gavin Nolan" (Instrumental)
 "Bars in the Booth (Session 2)" with Dres
 "Bars in the Booth (Session 3)" with Jakk Frost
 "Bars in the Booth (Session 4)" with A.G.
 "Bars in the Booth (Session 5)" with Loaded Lux
 "Bars in the Booth (Session 6)" with Bumpy Knuckles

Various Artists 
 "Najsilniejsi przetrwają" (featuring Pyskaty, Numer Raz, Proceente, Pelson, Rahim, Łysol, Mielzky, Dwa Sławy, Zeus, Chada, Klasik, Quebonafide, JodSen, Joteste, Bezczel, Siwers & Ten Typ Mes) (produced by DJ Premier & Luxon)

Papoose 
 "Current Events"

Various Artists - DJ Premier X Serato 2x12" 

 A1. NYGz - "My Influences"
 A2. The Lady of Rage - "Chemical Burn"
 A3. "Spaced Dem Mo" (Instrumental)
 A4. "Scarz Face" (Instrumental)

D.I.T.C. - The Remix Project 

 01. "Diggin' In the Crates (DJ Premier Remix)" (featuring Diamond D, Showbiz, A.G. & Lord Finesse)

Skyzoo & Torae - Barrel Brothers 

 14. "The Aura" (co-produced by AntMan Wonder)

38 Spesh - The Art of Production 

 08. "The Meeting (Problems or Peace)" (featuring Kool G Rap)

Soulkast - Memento Mori 

 02. "French Touch"

Dilated Peoples - Directors of Photography 

 06. "Good As Gone"

First Division - Overworked & Underpaid 

 11. "This Iz Tha Time"

Ea$y Money - The Motive of Nearly Everybody, Yo 

 03. "Nothin Alike"

Dynamic Duo - A Giant Step (single) 

 01. "AEAO"
 02. "Animal"

Saigon - G.S.N.T. 3: The Troubled Times of Brian Carenard 

 08. "Let's Get Smart"
 09. "One Foot In The Door" (featuring Big Daddy Kane)
 10. "Nunya"

Leftover
 "One Foot In The Door" (featuring Big Daddy Kane) (Original version)

Diabolic - Fightin' Words 

 01. "Diabolical Sound"

Ryan Bowers - Owtsider 

 02. "The Premier"

Various Artists - Shady XV 

 05. "Y'all Ready Know" (by Slaughterhouse)

PRhyme - PRhyme 
 01. "PRhyme"
 02. "Dat Sound Good" (featuring Ab-Soul & Mac Miller)
 03. "U Looz"
 04. "You Should Know" (featuring Dwele)
 05. "Courtesy"
 06. "Wishin'" (featuring Common)
 07. "To Me, To You" (featuring Jay Electronica)
 08. "Underground Kings" (featuring Schoolboy Q & Killer Mike)
 09. "Microphone Preem" (featuring Slaughterhouse)
 2015 bonus tracks
 10. "Golden Era" (featuring Joey Badass)
 11. "Wishin' II" (featuring Black Thought)
 12. "Highs and Lows" (featuring MF DOOM & Phonte)
 13. "Mode II" (featuring Logic)

Paolo Nutini 

 "Let Me Down Easy (DJ Premier Remix)"

2015

DJ Premier 

 "Bars in the Booth (Session 7)" with Skyzoo & Torae
 "Bars in the Booth (Session 8)" with Ras Kass

Joey Bada$$ - B4.DA.$$  

 03. "Paper Trail$"

The Four Owls - Natural Order 

 04. "Think Twice"

DJ EFN - Another Time 

 09. "Who's Crazy?" (featuring Troy Ave, Scarface, Stalley & DJ Premier)

Big Shug - Triple OGzus 

 01. "I Am Somebody"
 02. "I Bleed for This"
 09. "Off Rip" (featuring Termanology & Singapore Kane)

Lion Babe 

 "Wonder Woman (DJ Premier Remix)"

DJ Premier & BMB Spacekid 

 "Til It's Done" (featuring Anderson .Paak)

Jakk Frost 

 "Dope Boy Talk"

DJ Snake - Encore (Target Edition) 

 16. "You Know You Like It (DJ Premier Remix)"

King Magnetic - Timing Is Everything

 09. "Status"

Papoose - You Can't Stop Destiny 

 04. "The Plug"

Various Artists  - Southpaw (Music from and Inspired By the Motion Picture) 
 11. "Mode" (by PRhyme featuring Logic)

Dr. Dre - Compton 

 14. "Animals" (featuring Anderson .Paak, additional production by BMB Spacekid)

Sidney Max 

 "Here Come The Birds" (featuring Dres)

Torae - Entitled 

 15. "Saturday Night"

G. Fisher - God MC 
 "Fish Over Premier"

Various Artists - NBA 2K16 (soundtrack) 
 "Hold the City Down" (by Papoose)
 "Bum Bum Bum" (Instrumental)

The Game - The Documentary 2 

 15. "The Documentary 2"

Termanology - Term Brady - EP 

 09. "Get off the Ground (DJ Premier Mix)" (featuring Sean Price, Fame, Ruste Juxx, Justin Tyme, Hannibal Stax, Papoose & Reks)

Jimi Charles Moody 

 "Other Man (DJ Premier Remix)"

2016

DJ Premier & The Badder
 "Rockin' With The Best" (featuring Royce da 5'9")

Bumpy Knuckles & Sy Ari
 "EmOsHuNaL GrEeD"

Yuna - Chapters (Deluxe Edition)
 11. "Places to Go"

Kanye West
 "I Love Kanye (T.L.O.Preemix)"

Royce da 5'9" - Tabernacle: Trust the Shooter
 01. "Black History"

Classified - Greatful
 01. "Filthy"

D.I.T.C. - Sessions
 10. "Connect 3" (featuring Diamond D, A.G. & O.C.)

Torii Wolf
 "1st (Remix)" (featuring Dilated Peoples)
 "Shadows Crawl (Open Eyes Remix)" (featuring Rapsody)

DJ Premier & Bumpy Knuckles
 "Rock The Room" (featuring Flavor Flav)

Desiigner
 "Tiimmy Turner (Preemix)"

Twenty One Pilots
 "Lane Boy (DJ Premier Remix)"

The Lox - Filthy America... It's Beautiful
 05. "Move Forward"

2017

Faith Evans & The Notorious B.I.G. - The King & I
 24. "NYC" (featuring Jadakiss)

DJ Premier
 "2 Lovin U" (with Miguel)
 "My Space Baby" (with Cherub)

MC Eiht - Which Way Iz West
 06. "Runn the Blocc" (featuring Young Maylay)
 13. "Last Ones Left" (featuring Compton's Most Wanted)
 14. "4 Tha OG'z" (featuring Bumpy Knuckles)

Torii Wolf - Flow Riiot
 01. "Everlasting Peace"
 02. "Meant to Do"
 03. "1st"
 04. "Big Big Trouble"
 06. "I'd Wait Forever and a Day for You"
 08. "Go from Here"
 09. "Shadows Crawl"
 10. "Nobody Around"
 12. "Where We Belong"

Miley Cyrus - Younger Now (The Remixes)
 03. "Younger Now (DJ Premier Remix)"

Slaine & Termanology - Anti-Hero
 02. "Anti-Hero" (featuring Bun B & Everlast)

ASAP Ferg
 "Our Streets"

2018

Evidence -  Weather or Not

 12. "10,000 Hours"

Apathy -  The Widow's Son

 05. "The Order"

PRhyme - PRhyme 2

01. "Interlude 1 (Salute)"
02. "Black History"
03. "1 of the Hardest"
04. "Era" (featuring Dave East)
05. "Respect My Gun" (featuring Roc Marciano)
06. "W.O.W. (With Out Warning)" (featuring Yelawolf)
07. "Sunflower Seeds" (featuring Novel & Summer of '96)
08. "Streets at Night"
09. "Rock It"
10. "Loved Ones" (featuring Rapsody)
11. "My Calling"
12. "Made Men" (featuring Big K.R.I.T. & Denaun Porter)
13. "Relationships (Skit)"
14. "Flirt" (featuring 2 Chainz)
15. "Everyday Struggle" (featuring Chavis Chandler)
16. "Do Ya Thang"
17. "Gotta Love It" (featuring Brady Watt & CeeLo Green)

Torii Wolf & DJ Premier - Love Me (Amazon Original)

 "Silent Crow"

Trick-Trick - SmokeGang
11. "Get 2 It" (featuring B-Real)

38 Spesh & Kool G Rap -  Son of G Rap

 "The Meeting"
 "Young 1s" (featuring Che'Noir & Anthony Hamilton)

J. Cole 

 "1985 (DJ Premier 1966 Remix)"

Rudimental 

 "These Days (DJ Premier Remix)" (featuring Jess Glynne, Macklemore & Dan Caplen)

Drake - Scorpion 

10. "Sandra's Rose" (additional production by Maneesh)

Casanova 
 "Wut U Said"

2019

Papoose - Underrated
 02. "Numerical Slaughter"

Masta Ace & Marco Polo - A Breukelen Story
 "E.A.T. (Evolve And Transcend)" (featuring Evidence) (Bonus Track)

Conway The Machine, Westside Gunn & Benny the Butcher
 "Headlines"

Mike Posner
 "Slow It Down"

Gang Starr - One of the Best Yet
01. "The Sure Shot (Intro)"
02. "Lights Out" (featuring M.O.P.)
03. "Bad Name"
04. "Hit Man" (featuring Q-Tip)
05. "What's Real" (featuring Group Home & Royce Da 5'9")
06. "Keith Casim Elam (Interlude)"
07. "From A Distance" (featuring Jeru The Damaja) 
08. "Family and Loyalty" (featuring J. Cole)
09. "Get Together" (featuring Ne-Yo & Nitty Scott)
10. "NYGz/GS 183rd (Interlude)"
11. "So Many Rappers"
12. "Business Or Art" (featuring Talib Kweli)
13. "Bring It Back Here"
14. "One Of The Best Yet (Big Shug Interlude)"
15. "Take Flight (Militia, Pt. 4)" (featuring Big Shug & Freddie Foxxx)
16. "Bless the Mic"

Big Shug - The Diamond Report
 02. "EMF"
 11. "Still Big"

David Bars - The Bar Code
01. "Just like that"
04. "Beat The Odds"

2020

Bishop Nehru - Nehruvia: My Disregarded Thoughts
05. "Too Lost"

The Four Owls - Nocturnal Instinct 
07. "100%"

Jamo Gang - Walking With Lions 
05. "The 1st Time" (feat. Slug, Tyler Kimbro)

Westside Gunn - Pray for Paris 
11. "Shawn vs Flair"

Singapore Kane - Don Manifesto 
05. "Dreams and Visions"

Public Enemy - What You Gonna Do When the Grid Goes Down? 
03. "State Of The Union (STFU)"

Armani Caesar - The Liz 
07. "Simply Done" (feat. Benny the Butcher)

Conway the Machine - From King to a God 
14. "Nothin' Less"

Busta Rhymes - Extinction Level Event 2: The Wrath of God 
10. "True Indeed"

Papoose - Endangered Species 
11. "Workin"

Russ - CHOMP 
03. "Inside Job"

Gang Starr 
00. "Glowing Mics"

2021

Gang Starr 
 "Glowing Mics (Founders Rmx)" featuring Big Shug

Papoose 
 "NBA Rhyme Scheme"

Westside Gunn 
 "Narcissist"

Russ - CHOMP 2 
07. "Free" featuring Big K.R.I.T., Snoop Dogg & DJ Premier

DJ Premier & 2 Chainz 
 "Mortgage Free"

DJ Premier 

 "Why Would I Stop" featuring Wale

2022

Mass Appeal Records - Hip Hop 50 EP Vol.1  
01. "Lettin Off Steam" (feat. Joey Bada$$)
02. "Remy Rap" (feat. Remy Ma, Rapsody)
03. "Beat Breaks" (feat. Nas)
04. "Terrible 2´s" (feat. Run The Jewels)
05. "Root Of It All" (feat. Slick Rick, Lil Wayne)

Sonnyjim & The Purist - White Girl Wasted 
 03. "Doc Ellis" (featuring DJ Premier)

Black Soprano Family - Live Long DJ Shay 
 "Times Is Rough"

Liam Gallagher 
 "Diamond In The Dark (DJ Premier Remix)

Prodigy - The Hegelian Dialectic 2: The Book of Heroine 
 "Walk Out" (featuring DJ Premier)

El Gant - O.S.L.O. 
 03. "Leave It Alone"

Teflon 
 "Contraband"

Feid 
 "Le Pido a Dios"

Ab-Soul - Herbert 
 18. "Gotta Rap"

References

External links
 DJ Premier Trackology

Discography
Production discographies
Hip hop discographies
Discographies of American artists